Shea Ellese Groom (born March 4, 1993) is an American professional soccer player who plays as a forward for Houston Dash in the National Women's Soccer League.

Groom played collegiate soccer for Texas A&M Aggies before starting her professional career with FC Kansas City in 2015. She was traded to Sky Blue FC after FC Kansas City ceased operations in 2018, before joining Seattle Reign FC in 2019. She is currently a member of the Houston Dash.

Groom is a former United States youth international. She received her first call-up to the full national team in October 2016 but has yet to win a cap.

Early life
Born in Liberty, Missouri to Kelly and Lesa Groom, Groom attended Liberty High School where she led the girls' soccer team to a state championship and was named Missouri's Player of the Year in 2010. She was named Gatorade Missouri Player of the year twice in 2010 and 2011. Groom was a NSCAA High School Girls' All-America Soccer Team selection and named NSCAA State Player of the Year in 2010. In 2011, she was named All-American by ESPN Rise.

Collegiate career
Groom played collegiate soccer with Texas A&M Aggies. She capped a decorated college career with 16 goals and seven assists in 26 matches in 2014. She ranked third in the Southeastern Conference and 19th in the nation for goals, which helped her win the SEC Offensive Player of the Year award.

She recorded 41 goals and 25 assists in 84 career matches for the Aggies.

Club career

FC Kansas City, 2015–2017
Groom was selected by FC Kansas City as the 12th overall pick of the 2015 NWSL College Draft. She made her debut for Kansas City against Sky Blue FC on 12 April 2015.

Shea scored her first goal for Kansas City in a 0–2 win over Houston Dash on 2 May 2015.

Groom was named Player of the Week for week 13 of the 2015 National Women's Soccer League season after recording one goal and two assists against the Boston Breakers. She was also named the team's rookie of the year for 2015.

Groom appeared in the 2015 NWSL Championship game as a second-half substitute, FC Kansas City won the Championship with a 1–0 win over the Seattle Reign.

Sky Blue FC, 2018 
On December 29, 2017 it was announced that Utah Royals FC had traded Groom along with teammate Christina Gibbons to Sky Blue FC and the no. 4 overall selection in the 2018 NWSL College Draft. The New Jersey club has acquired the players in exchange for the defender Kelley O'Hara, midfielder Taylor Lytle and the no. 25 overall pick in the 2018 NWSL College Draft.

Reign FC, 2019 
On January 15, 2019, Reign FC acquired Groom from Sky Blue FC.

Houston Dash, 2020–present 
On February 3, 2020, Houston Dash acquired Groom, Megan Oyster, and a conditional draft pick from Reign FC in exchange for Sofia Huerta and Amber Brooks.

International career 
Groom has represented the United States at various youth levels. She played for the under-23 national team at the 2015 La Manga Tournament. She started in all three matches and scored the first goal of the 2–0 victory over Norway.

In October 2016, Groom received her first call-up to the United States women's national soccer team for a pair of friendlies against Switzerland. She did not play in either game.

Personal life 
Groom's older sister, Kami, is a competitive ultimate player and has represented the United States on various national teams.

Club statistics

Honors 
FC Kansas City
 NWSL Championship: 2015

Houston Dash
 NWSL Challenge Trophy: 2020

Individual
 NWSL Second XI: 2016

References

External links 

 
 
 FC Kansas City player profile
 Texas A&M player profile
 
 

1993 births
Living people
American women's soccer players
Texas A&M Aggies women's soccer players
National Women's Soccer League players
FC Kansas City players
Soccer players from Missouri
Sportspeople from the Kansas City metropolitan area
People from Liberty, Missouri
Women's association football forwards
FC Kansas City draft picks
NJ/NY Gotham FC players
OL Reign players
Houston Dash players